Dmitry Ivanovich Ryabyshev , ( – November 18, 1985) was a Soviet military commander, commander of 8th Mechanized Corps (1941).

Before World War II 
Ryabyshev was born in Kolotovka, Don Host Oblast, Russian Empire (in present-day Rostov Oblast, Russia). In 1917 he joined the Bolshevik Party. Following the Russian Revolution of 1917 he was a commander of the 42nd Brigade, 14th Division of the 1st Cavalry Army during the Russian Civil War.

World War II 
During the Second World War, he held several commands, including the 34th Tank Division, 4th Cavalry Corps, 8th Mechanized Corps, 38th Army, Southern Front, 57th Army, 28th Army and 3rd Guards Army.

1894 births
1985 deaths
People from Tsimlyansky District
People from Don Host Oblast
Old Bolsheviks
Communist Party of the Soviet Union members
First convocation members of the Verkhovna Rada of the Ukrainian Soviet Socialist Republic
Soviet lieutenant generals
Soviet military personnel of the Russian Civil War
Soviet military personnel of World War II
Russian people of World War II
Russian military leaders
Russian memoirists
Recipients of the Order of Lenin
Recipients of the Order of the Red Banner
Recipients of the Order of Bogdan Khmelnitsky (Soviet Union), 1st class
Recipients of the Order of Suvorov, 2nd class
Recipients of the Order of Kutuzov, 2nd class
Frunze Military Academy alumni
20th-century memoirists
People nominated for the title Hero of the Soviet Union